Ilyinka is a rural locality (a selo) and the administrative centre of Ilyinskoye Rural Settlement, Shebalinsky District, the Altai Republic, Russia. The population was 690 as of 2016. There are 5 streets.

Geography 
Ilyinka is located 85 km northwest of Shebalino (the district's administrative centre) by road. Mariinsk is the nearest rural locality.

References 

Rural localities in Shebalinsky District